The Copa Libertadores 1990 was won by Club Olimpia after defeating Barcelona Sporting Club with a 3-1 aggregate in the finals. One of the players for Olimpia was legendary goalkeeper Ever Hugo Almeida, who retired from professional football the following year.

Group stage

Group 1

Group 2
Note: The other two Colombian teams that qualified for the tournament withdrew due to logistical issues, as CONEMBOL banned Colombia from hosting matches due to threats made by drug lords to referees in the previous tournament in 1989, with the murder of one of them interrupting the league without a champion being declared. The champion, Atletico Nacional of Medellín, had a bye to the second round as the current champion, but had to play their home games in Chile for this tournament.

Group 3

Group 4

First Place Playoff Match
CA Progreso beat Defensor Sporting 4–0 to decide the first team in the group.

Group 5

Second round

1 Olimpia had been drawn to face the third-placed team from Group 2, but that group was reduced to two teams after the withdrawal of Colombian teams.

Quarter-finals
 Note: Second leg between Vasco da Gama and Atlético Nacional was a replay in Santiago (Chile).  The original match ended with a victory by 2-0 for Atlético Nacional, but it was annulled following a protest by Vasco da Gama complaining of pressure on the referee by local drug lords.

Semifinals

Finals

First leg

Second leg

External links
 1990 Libertadores Cup in CONMEBOL's Website
 Copa Libertadores 1990 in RSSSF

1
Copa Libertadores seasons